Italo-Australian is an Australian-based dialect of Italian that is spoken by Australians of Italian descent.

Characteristics

The exact number of speakers is unknown, but it is highly speculated that the language is mainly spoken by the younger generations, passed on by the elder ancestors, who created the language. Some researchers think that the dialect might have been spoken by nearly 900,000 Italian Australians in 2012.

Origin

The foundation of this dialect is modern Italian, which was brought to Australia following the Italian diaspora in the post World War I era. It wasn't until the years after the second diaspora after World War II that the dialect came into note.

The language was simply created with modern Italian words being influenced by the vocabulary of the English language, to create Italian/English words. Some words follow the rules of Italian spelling, changing to an English one only with a few character changes to make it sound Italian. Italian linguist Tullio De Mauro has noted the dialect in his famous book 'Storia Della Lingua' as "developing dialect that is still enduring the modern influences of English".

De Mauro also claims the language is growing with the vocabulary being passed onto the younger generations of Italian Australians.

Example Words

See also

 Italian Australians
 Languages of Australia

References

Latino-Faliscan languages
Dialects of Italian
Australia
Languages of Australia
Italian-Australian culture
Romance languages in Oceania